Schwentinental is a town in the district of Plön, in Schleswig-Holstein, Germany. It was formed on 1 March 2008 from the former municipalities Raisdorf and Klausdorf.

References 

Plön (district)